Limnonectes isanensis is a species of fanged frogs in the family Dicroglossidae. It was discovered in Phu Luang Wildlife Sanctuary, Loei Province, Thailand in 2012. It belongs to the Limnonectes kuhlii species complex.

Photos

isanensis
Frogs of Asia
Amphibians of Thailand
Amphibians described in 2012